Control is an action-adventure game developed by Remedy Entertainment and published by 505 Games. The game was released in August 2019 for PlayStation 4, Windows, and Xbox One, and for PlayStation 5 and Xbox Series X/S in February 2021. Cloud-based versions for the Nintendo Switch and Amazon Luna were released in October 2020, followed by a version for Stadia in July 2021. Two paid expansions have been released.

The game revolves around the Federal Bureau of Control (FBC), a secret U.S. government agency tasked with containing and studying phenomena that violate the laws of reality. As Jesse Faden (Courtney Hope), the Bureau's new Director, the player explores the Oldest House – the FBC's paranormal headquarters – and utilizes powerful abilities in order to defeat a deadly enemy known as the Hiss, which has invaded and corrupted reality. The player gains abilities by finding Objects of Power, mundane objects like a rotary phone or a floppy disk imbued with energies from another dimension, that have been at the center of major paranormal events and since recovered by the FBC. In addition to Hope, voice work and live-action footage is provided by James McCaffrey, Matthew Porretta, and Martti Suosalo, while the band Poets of the Fall provided additional music.

Control is inspired by paranormal stories about the fictional SCP Foundation created by an online collaborative wiki fiction project, based on the genre of the new weird. The environments of the Oldest House are designed in the brutalist architecture style, common for many government buildings created during the Cold War era, which served as a setting to show off the game's destructive environmental systems. The core game includes many allusions to Alan Wake, one of Remedy's prior games with similar themes of the paranormal, and Control AWE expansion is a crossover between these two series, which Remedy said forms part of the Remedy Connected Universe. Control was one of the first games released to take advantage of real-time ray tracing built into the hardware of newer video cards.

Upon release, Control was met with positive reviews from critics, with several gaming publications naming it among their top games of 2019. The game was nominated for numerous video game awards, winning several related to the game's art and design. It sold over three million units by November 2022. A sequel, Control 2, and a separate four-player co-operative spin-off, codenamed Condor, were announced in June 2021.

Gameplay
Control is played from a third-person perspective. Control is set within the Oldest House, a featureless Brutalist skyscraper in New York City, and the headquarters of the fictional Federal Bureau of Control (FBC), which studies Altered World Events (AWEs) and collects and studies Objects of Power from these AWEs. The Oldest House, itself an Object of Power, has an interior far larger than its exterior; an enormous, constantly shifting supernatural realm that defies the laws of spacetime. At the onset of the game, an entity called the Hiss is attempting to cross over through a dimensional barrier into this reality and has taken over numerous parts of the Oldest House, reconfiguring its architecture to its needs, as well as many of the FBC employees to fight for it. The player controls Jesse Faden, who has come to the Oldest House seeking answers about her brother after a prior AWE, and becomes involved in the fight against the Hiss.

Control is built in the Metroidvania format, with a large world map that can be explored at a nonlinear pace, unlike Remedy's previous titles which were primarily linear. As the player completes the main story missions, they will encounter areas known as Control Points, which can be unlocked after clearing the area of enemies and then used both as save points and for fast travel throughout the building to previously unlocked Control Points. As the player completes missions, they unlock more of the building to explore, along with additional side quests, in addition to various rewards. These include skill points which can be used to improve psychokinetic powers that Jesse gains over the course of the game, such as projectile-launching debris at enemies or seizing control of enemies' minds temporarily to turn them into her allies. Mission rewards include resources that can be used to improve the function of the Service Weapon, a special gun that can take on multiple forms, ranging from a close-range shotgun-like blast to long-range sniper-like form, with each form outfitted with various perks. The player can equip perks to improve Jesse's base attributes. Various side-quests and optional time-limited mission alerts are available with additional rewards if completed.

An A.I. system known as the Encounter Director controls interactions with enemies based on the player's level and location in the Oldest House. Enemies in Control are predominantly human agents of the FBC possessed by the Hiss, an otherworldly force. They range from standard humans carrying firearms to heavily mutated variations that possess a variety of superpowers.

Synopsis

Setting
Control revolves around the Federal Bureau of Control (FBC), a clandestine U.S. government agency which investigates supernatural Altered World Events (AWEs). These AWEs are affected by the human collective unconscious and have a variety of "paranatural" effects, including the creation of Objects of Power, archetypal items which grant special abilities to their wielders. Objects of Power are connected to the Board, a black pyramid-shaped entity which exists within the Astral Plane, an alternate dimension. The individual chosen by the Board to wield the Service Weapon, an Object of Power, is considered by default to be the director of the FBC. Control takes place within the Oldest House, a Brutalist skyscraper in New York City that serves as the headquarters of the FBC. The Oldest House is a Place of Power with several paranatural characteristics: it resists being noticed by anyone other than FBC members and individuals with an innate sensitivity to the paranatural, it is larger on the inside than on the outside, and its internal architecture is prone to shifting and rearranging in unpredictable ways. The FBC is able to stabilize portions of the Oldest House for its use by harnessing nexuses of resonance called Control Points.

The protagonist of Control is Jesse Faden (Courtney Hope), who is chosen by the Board to replace the recently deceased Zachariah Trench (James McCaffrey) as the director of the FBC. Seventeen years prior to the game's events, Jesse and her younger brother Dylan (Sean Durrie) were involved in an Altered World Event in their hometown of Ordinary, Maine. After discovering an Object of Power in the form of a slide projector, the two children accidentally unleashed paranatural forces which caused Ordinary's adult population to vanish. Jesse and Dylan were rescued by Polaris, a mysterious telepathic entity. Shortly thereafter, the FBC arrived in Ordinary, capturing Dylan and the slide projector while Jesse fled. In the present day, Jesse arrives at the Oldest House seeking her brother's whereabouts.

Other notable characters in Control include missing Head of Research Casper Darling (Matthew Porretta), research specialist Emily Pope (Antonia Bernath), security chief Simon Arish (Ronan Summers), Head of Operations Helen Marshall (Brig Bennett), and Ahti (Martti Suosalo), a mysterious Finnish janitor.

Plot
In October 2019, Jesse Faden arrives at the Oldest House following a telepathic message from Polaris, seeking the whereabouts of her kidnapped brother Dylan. Inside the building, Jesse discovers the lifeless body of Zachariah Trench, and is instructed by Polaris to pick up his fallen Service Weapon. Jesse is translocated to the Astral Plane, where the Board appoints her as the new director of the FBC in Trench's stead. Exiting Trench's office, Jesse is attacked by FBC agents possessed by an entity Jesse dubs "the Hiss". Jesse learns that the Oldest House is under emergency lockdown following the Hiss's spread, and that everyone in the building has been possessed by the Hiss except those wearing Hedron Resonance Amplifiers (HRAs), devices built by missing Bureau scientist Dr. Casper Darling. Jesse agrees to aid the surviving agents in reclaiming the building and containing the Hiss, in exchange for Dylan's whereabouts.

Using an Object of Power known as the Hotline, Jesse communicates with the deceased Trench and learns that his former management team knows the secrets of the Bureau. After lifting the building's lockdown in the Maintenance Sector, Jesse enters the Research Sector in search of Helen Marshall, one of the members of Trench's management team, whom she helps secure the production of more HRAs. Marshall reveals that Dylan, known to the Bureau as Prime Candidate 6 or P6, was being groomed to succeed Trench as the Bureau's director due to his immense supernatural abilities. However, after killing several Bureau agents, Dylan was deemed too dangerous and locked away in the Containment Sector. Jesse rushes to the sector to find Dylan, only to learn that he has escaped and surrendered to the Bureau in the Executive Sector. Dylan reveals to Jesse that he has embraced the Hiss, and that the Hiss entered the Oldest House through the slide projector Object of Power the Bureau recovered from Ordinary.

Ahti, a paranatural entity who manifests as a janitor, gives Jesse a cassette player which enables her to navigate an elaborate maze protecting the slide projector's chamber in the Research Sector. She finds the slide projector missing, but learns that Trench and Darling used the device to enter an alternate dimension known as Slidescape-36, where they discovered an entity they dubbed Hedron. Jesse finds Hedron and discovers that it is Polaris, but moments later, the Hiss attacks and destroys Hedron. Jesse's mind is invaded by the Hiss, but Jesse is able to rediscover Polaris within herself, saving her and the Bureau. In the process, Jesse learns that Trench was the first individual to be possessed by the Hiss during the expeditions to Slidescape-36, and was responsible for releasing the Hiss into the Oldest House. Jesse finds the slide projector in the Executive Sector, where Dylan and the Hiss are attempting to enter the Astral Plane through a portal and overtake the Board. Jesse deactivates the slide projector and seemingly cleanses the Hiss from Dylan, which closes the portal but leaves him in a coma. In the aftermath, the Oldest House remains infested by the Hiss and under lockdown to prevent its escape, but Jesse has come to terms with her new role as director and resolves to find a solution together with the FBC's surviving personnel.

The Foundation
Jesse is summoned by the Board to the Foundation, a cavernous area lying at the center of the Oldest House which houses the Nail, an object that connects the Oldest House to the Astral Plane. Jesse finds that the Nail has been seriously damaged, which is causing the Astral Plane to leak into the Oldest House, with potentially catastrophic consequences. As Jesse attempts to restore the Nail, she seeks the whereabouts of Helen Marshall, who entered the Foundation during the Hiss invasion, and has gone missing. Meanwhile, Jesse discovers logs left behind by Theodore Ash, Jr., a Bureau scientist who was part of the first expeditions to the Oldest House in 1964. Ash reveals that Broderick Northmoor, the director who preceded Trench, fell under the Board's influence during the expedition, and was responsible for radically changing the Bureau in order to serve the Board's interests.

As Jesse continues to restore the Nail, she encounters Former, an extradimensional entity which grants Jesse a new ability, enraging the Board. Former claims to have once been a member of the Board, but was exiled after being blamed for an unknown transgression. Torn between the two entities, Jesse is eventually able to restore the Nail, but tremors occur between the Oldest House and the Astral Plane which threaten to destroy both dimensions. Jesse reaches the base of the Nail, where she finds Marshall possessed by the Hiss. With the aid of Former, Jesse kills Marshall and cleanses the Nail. Jesse learns that it was Marshall who destroyed the Nail, as a preventative measure against both the Hiss and the Board. The Board destroyed Marshall's HRA in response, allowing her to be possessed by the Hiss. Her faith in the Board shattered, Jesse vows to lead the Bureau her own way.

AWE
AWE is a crossover between Control and Remedy Entertainment's previous title, Alan Wake. Alan Wake takes place in Bright Falls, Washington; in that game, writer Alan Wake finds himself coerced and trapped by the Dark Presence that inhabited Bright Falls' Cauldron Lake, able to turn his writings into reality. Following the events of Alan Wake (as described in Control), Emil Hartman, a psychologist who attempted to investigate and exploit this power, was confronted and arrested by agents of the FBC, who confiscated all of his research on the lake. In a final act of desperation, Hartman dove into Cauldron Lake and was possessed by the Dark Presence. Hartman was subsequently captured and brought to the Oldest House by the Bureau, who attempted to contain him in the Investigations Sector. However, after Hartman breached containment, the Bureau was forced to completely abandon the sector. During the Hiss invasion, the Hiss mixed with the Dark Presence in Hartman, twisting him into a monstrous entity which haunts the sector.

Jesse is summoned to the Investigations Sector by an apparition of Alan Wake, who otherwise was considered missing after events of Alan Wake. As Jesse attempts to restore the Investigations Sector and destroy Hartman, she learns from Alan that he was responsible for unleashing Hartman, using his power to rewrite reality using works of fiction. Alan implies that he was responsible for the Hiss invasion, as to create a "crisis" for his "hero", Jesse, for unknown reasons. Jesse reaches the Bright Falls AWE area of the Investigations Sector and destroys Hartman. She is informed by FBC agents of a newly detected AWE in Bright Falls, the date of which is several years in the future.

Development
Control was developed by Remedy Entertainment. As their first major release since their initial public offering in 2017 and separation from Microsoft as a publishing partner, Control was developed using more efficient development strategies to keep costs and time low. In contrast to Alan Wake and Quantum Break which took seven and five years to complete respectively, Control was completed within three years with a €30 million budget, lower than the typical costs of a triple-A game.

Mikael Kasurinen, who worked on Alan Wake (as lead gameplay designer) and Quantum Break (as lead director), was Control director and Sam Lake served as the game's writer and creative director alongside narrative lead Anna Megill. Development of the game began before the release of Quantum Break. As they were finishing Quantum Break and deciding on the next project, Kasurinen recognized that that game rested heavily on full motion video and other cinematic elements, and suggested they look at a more open-world game where the player would drive what they experienced. Instead of focusing on creating a large and complex story, Remedy wanted to put more emphasis on creating a game world and universe that is rich enough for players to craft their own stories. The team still wanted to leave narrative elements for players to discover to help flesh out the world, and added optional documents, audio logs, and live-action video footage that the player could review at their own pace. Another goal for the team was to create a game that has high replayability. They still stated that they wanted to make a strong narrative, one that is "narrowly focused" according to Kasurinen.

Setting
The first concept down was creating the fictional FBC, a realistic setting that would serve as a basis for paranormal events and a catalyst for events in the story. This enabled Remedy to consider multiple stories they could tell, not just about the player-character but other individuals in the FBC, but this also created the challenge of how to present the stories of the other characters in the open-world format. The gathered writings of the fictional SCP Foundation ("Secure, Contain, Protect") website was a major influence on Control. Stories on SCP Foundation's site are based on singular objects with strange paranormal impacts, and as a whole, they are narratively linked by the common format of reports written by the fictional SCP Foundation, which catalogs and studies the objects. Control was built atop this, having the various Objects of Power and Altered Items, along with numerous collectable writings about these objects or other stories in line with SCP. They fixed the story in the genre of the new weird, a modern variant of weird fiction with stories that combine science fiction and fantasy often with a bureaucratic government agency involved in these events. In Control, they reversed the role to make the bureaucracy at the center of the story. Narrative designer Brooke Maggs stated "there is an invisible, assailing presence of bureaucracy in the corporate office setting that is in itself, unsettling". The mundane features of the Oldest House helped to contrast against the paranormal aspects of the game, thus well-suiting the new weird, according to world design director Stuart MacDonald. The design team's goal in using the new weird approach was not to create terrifying moments as one would do in a horror game, but instead create a continuing sense of dread for the player.

The everyday objects that would become Objects of Power in the game were selected to be within the concept of the new weird. One such Object of Power is a floppy disk. MacDonald said he was drawn to use a floppy disk in this manner after reading a story about how many of the United States national missile defense sites had only recently transitioned off floppy disks, and prior to that, these disks could be seen as proverbial weapons that were held with high reverence. The copious presence in the Oldest House of 1960s and 1970s technology such as pneumatic tubes, slide projectors and monochrome monitors, and the absence of modern-day technologies such as cell phones, is explained in-game as the result of the tendency of newer technologies to fail or malfunction within the boundaries of the Oldest House.

The Oldest House setting was based on brutalist architecture, a style utilizing large concrete blocks popularized in the 1950s and used in many government buildings at the time. The game's world design director, Stuart Macdonald, described brutalism as a good science-fiction setting, as it has "this sense of power, weight, strength and stability to it", and when the Oldest House's geometries are affected by the Hiss, "it makes for a really good contrast with the impossible architecture". The relatively flat colors of the background walls made it an ideal canvas to showcase other design and lighting effects in the game. It served well into the telekinesis powers of the game, as the concrete walls would be used in lieu of a target object when the player throws debris at foes via telekinesis, and the initially pristine spaces end up showing the results of a large, destructive battle. Among real-world influences in the game's architecture is 33 Thomas Street, formerly known as the AT&T Long Lines Building, a windowless building in the center of New York City. Macdonald used this building as a modern example of brutalism, and created the Oldest House as a "bizarre, brutalist monolith" to house the FBC. Other real-world locations used as inspiration included the Boston City Hall, the Andrews Building at the University of Toronto Scarborough, and the Met Breuer.

Other real-world architects inspired the game's structures. Carlo Scarpa's work was used heavily in designing stairways that ascended with other parts of the structure, while Tadao Ando's focus on lighting and spiritual spaces were reflected in other parts of the game. Additionally, the design team turned to film for other inspiration. Films of Stanley Kubrick, particularly A Clockwork Orange, as well as films featuring oppressive government agencies, such as The Shape of Water, served as part of the design basis. Other films, like Tinker Tailor Soldier Spy, evoke the concept of repetitiveness, process, and ritualism in these agencies, and that was used to define some of the internal artwork and architecture. Art director Janne Pulkkinen stated they looked at real world churches and other places where ritualism is common, as lighting and design of those spaces are often used to draw attention to specific points of interest.

Certain areas of the game feature full-motion video sequences. Most of these are of Dr. Casper Darling explaining parts of the Oldest House and Objects of Power within it, with Darling played by Matthew Porretta. Another set of videos are short episodes of a fictional show called "The Threshold Kids", a puppet-based show seemingly aimed at children who may reside within the Oldest House. "The Threshold Kids" was written by narrative lead Anna Megill and produced by senior cinematic designer Mircea Purdea. Poets of the Fall, an alternative rock group that are close friends of Remedy, provided songs for the game, including "Take Control", in-game stated to be by the fictional band "The Old Gods of Asgard", itself an allusion back to Alan Wake. Remedy used this song as part of the game's "Ashtray Maze", a section where Jesse fights through an ever-changing set of rooms set to the song. Remedy worked with Poets of the Fall so that they could incorporate the song dynamically as the player progressed through sections of the maze.

The core game includes Easter eggs referring to Alan Wake, which shares similar paranormal themes with Control; one such Easter egg discusses the aftermath of Alan Wake as part of the FBC's case files, which concerned what happened in Bright Falls, the primary location of Alan Wake, to have been an AWE. A secret area includes a vision of Alan Wake. The past event in the town of Ordinary was alluded to by a backmasking track in the credits sequence of Alan Wake: American Nightmare, with an unknown speaker stating "It will happen again, in another town. A town called Ordinary." Kasurinen said that the inclusion of such references helps to establish a type of continuity between its games, elements to be found and shared by its player community, but not meant to necessarily establish a shared universe between the games. However, Sam Lake later confirmed the existence of a shared universe between Alan Wake and Control known as the Remedy Connected Universe. This later was cemented with the release of the AWE expansion, directly bringing characters and events of Alan Wake into Control.

Cast
The game's main voice cast was announced at New York Comic Con in 2018, consisting of various actors from Remedy's previous games. Courtney Hope, who played the character Beth Wilder in Quantum Break, stars as Jesse Faden, while James McCaffrey, known for his roles as the title character of Max Payne and Thomas Zane in Alan Wake, plays the role of Zachariah Trench. Matthew Porretta, who portrayed the titular character of Alan Wake, is featured in both voice roles and live-action videos as the character of Dr. Casper Darling. Finnish actor Martti Suosalo voices the janitor Ahti. Remedy's Sam Lake said that he had been yearning to add his native Finland to one of their games, and Control presented that opportunity to incorporate this. Among these pieces is a Finnish tango which Lake wrote, Petri Alanko composed, and Suosalo sang.

The game includes a voice cameo by Hideo Kojima and his English translator Aki Saito; in one side mission, a recording by Dr. Yoshimi Tokui, voiced by Kojima, relates a dream-like experience in Japanese, with the English translation given by Saito.

Technology

A further challenge in the game's design and implementation involved creating an environment that would encourage the player to explore, get lost in it, and learn by observation. Kasurinen felt they did not want to include a traditional heads-up display for the player, with mission markers or other clutter, and instead have the player use mission descriptions in their log and careful observation of the environment to figure out where to go next. This further led to the decision to only tell player critical information via some means, leaving the player to fill in the missing parts with their own observations and imaginations. They also wanted a fluid environment, where nearly any object in it could be used as part of the player-character's telekinetic powers, so that the game world could be both a weapon to be used by the player, or a weapon against the player-character. To achieve this, Remedy replaced the Havok physics in their in-house game engine with PhysX, and improved their artificial intelligence to enable enemies to take advantage of these changes. Control is built using Remedy's proprietary Northlight Engine, which was first used on the company's previous title Quantum Break.

Control was one of the first major games to be released after the introduction of graphics cards that support real-time ray-tracing through DirectX Raytracing. It was the first major title with a nearly-full implementation of all available Nvidia RTX features along with support for Nvidia's DLSS for resolution upscaling on supported graphics cards. The game also supports more standard rendering techniques suitable for less powerful graphical hardware.

Nvidia heavily promoted Control in its campaign alongside its first RTX graphics cards featuring hardware ray-tracing support. The game was bundled with sales of graphics cards supporting the RTX technology. Nvidia created or hosted nine videos, including an exclusive gameplay trailer, to display the game's ray-tracing integration.

Release

Marketing
In May 2017, Remedy announced that they had partnered with 505 Games to publish the game, then codenamed "P7". 505 provided marketing and publishing support and a fund of €7.75 million to assist the game's development, while Remedy retained the intellectual property rights to Control. In the press release, Remedy revealed that the game will have complex gameplay mechanics and that it will be a "longer term experience" than its previous games. P7 was being worked on by Remedy alongside two other projects. The game was officially revealed at Sony Interactive Entertainment's E3 2018 press conference.

The game was released on 27 August 2019 for PlayStation 4, Windows, and Xbox One.

On 27 August 2020, the first anniversary of the game's release, Control: Ultimate Edition was released via Steam, including the base game, both the "Foundation" and "AWE" expansions, and the additional free updates. Control: Ultimate Edition launched on the Epic Games Store, GOG.com, PlayStation 4 and Xbox One on 10 September 2020, and on PlayStation 5 and Xbox Series X/S on 2 February 2021. Players who owned the Ultimate Edition on PlayStation 4 or Xbox One were able to update their version to the newer consoles for free. 505 Games stated that while they looked to find a free upgrade path that would work for all users but that there was "some form of blocker and those blockers meant that at least one group of players ended up being left out of the upgrade for various reasons." The PlayStation 5 and Xbox Series X/S versions and updates were delayed until early 2021 in an announcement just prior to the consoles' launches in November 2020 to improve the quality of the product. Digital versions were released on 2 February 2021, and retail copies on 2 March 2021. The Ultimate Edition was also released for Amazon Luna on 20 January 2022.

Cloud gaming-based versions of the game were released for Amazon Luna and Nintendo Switch on 20 October 2020 and 28 October 2020, respectively. It was the first cloud-based game released on the Switch outside of Japan.  Control was released on Google Stadia in July 2021.

Post-release
Remedy affirmed plans for at least two additional content expansions to Control, titled "The Foundation" and "AWE", both narratively set after the main game with Jesse taking on her role as the FBC Director. However, at the time of Controls launch, the specifics of this content had yet to be determined, according to narrative designer Brooke Maggs, as the team's focus was on addressing performance issues for the console version of the games. "The Foundation" released on 26 March 2020 for PlayStation 4 and Microsoft Windows and for Xbox One on 25 June 2020. The second expansion "AWE" was released on 27 August 2020, marking the game's first anniversary.

Additional smaller, non-narrative content has been released. The first, "Expeditions", was released as a free update on 12 December 2019, and presents standalone missions of various difficulty with power-up items for their character. A free update, to release alongside the "AWE" DLC but available for all players, will increase the number of control points, or "hard" checkpoints in the game where saving the game is possible, including adding ones before boss fights, as well as several "soft" checkpoints where players can restart without having to travel back to a control point should Jesse die. A new "assist mode" will allow for the player to have more control on customizing the game's difficulty, with Remedy intending this to make it possible for novice players to complete the game.

In January 2021, The Art and Making of Control, a companion book about the development of Control was published by Future Press.

Remedy announced in June 2021 they signed a deal with 505 Games to develop two additional games based on Control. One will be a "bigger budget" follow-up to Control, while the second is a smaller, four-player co-operative spin-off, codenamed Condor. In November 2022, Remedy affirmed the big-budget title will be a direct sequel to Control titled Control 2, which had begun development with 505 Games by that time and is planned for release on Windows, PlayStation 5, and Xbox Series X/S.

Reception

Control received "generally favorable reviews", according to review aggregator Metacritic.

Jeff Gerstmann of Giant Bomb awarded it 5 out of 5 stars and stated it as "a smart and sensational action-adventure." Phil Iwaniuk of PCGamesN gave the game a positive review and stated it as "a gripping descent into something between alternate history and fever dream, realized beautifully in audiovisual flair, and lacking just slightly in the combat itself." Sam Loveridge of GamesRadar+ awarded it 4.5 out of 5 stars and praised its "unique" setting, "TV-like" storytelling, "phenomenal" characters and "downright bonkers" moments, though criticized its short length. James Davenport of PC Gamer gave the game a score of 88/100 and praised its "mystery, wonder, and glorious room-destroying combat", though criticized its "thin" protagonist and "abrupt" ending. Jonathon Dornbush of IGN gave the game 8.8/10 and praised the "engrossingly weird paranormal world", Jesse's "versatile psychic skills and main weapon", "strong" supporting cast, "well-written" script, though called Jesse's personal story an "afterthought".

Peter Brown of GameSpot gave the game 8/10 and praised the "gorgeous" art style, "fascinating" sets, "stylish" combat, though criticized the "confusing" map.  Dave Tach of Polygon and stated, "I can't separate Controls deliberate oddities from its beauty or from its characters, and that's what makes it so easy to recommend." Michael Leri of GameRevolution gave the game 9/10 and praised the "fast-paced" combat, "intriguing" lore, challenging puzzles, cast, "beautifully constructed & destructible" environments, though criticized its "shaky performance on non-Pro consoles", "overly punishing" boss fights and long checkpoints. Michael Huber of Easy Allies gave the game 9/10 and stated it as an "incredible marriage of storytelling, world building, exploration, and combat", praising the "obsessive" attention to detail, ensemble cast and the protagonist.

Mike Williams of USgamer gave the game 4/5 and stated, "The Oldest House allows Remedy to play with new ideas and variations on traditional gameplay, breaking up the shooting and superhuman powers with games of red light/green light and journeys through Alice in Wonderland-style mazes. The dialog is still odd, and the mission structure can be obtuse at times." Gabe Gurwin of Digital Trends gave the game 3.5/5 and praised the gunplay, abilities, cast, presentation and setting, though criticized its story, texture issues, "filler" side missions and "unoriginal" powers. Christian Donlan of Eurogamer praised its "giddy" action and "astonishing" art design.

Digital Foundry and Polygon considered Control on PC to potentially be a "killer app" for Nvidia's RTX graphics cards, citing it as helping to enhance the game's visual style.

Sales 
The PlayStation 4 version of Control was the 13th bestselling retail game during its first week of release in Japan, with 10,336 physical copies being sold. By December 2020, the game had sold over 2 million units across all platforms, and Remedy stated Control was their fastest-growing intellectual property since Max Payne. By August 2021, Remedy stated that over 10 million people had played Control, accounting for those that played it through Xbox Game Pass and other non-sales routes. By November 2022, the game had sold over three million units.

Awards
IGN chose Control as their "Game of the Year", along with other awards including "Best Action-Adventure Game", "Best Video Game Art Direction", and "Best Video Game Story". Game Informer, Electronic Gaming Monthly, and GamesRadar+ also awarded Control as their "Game of the Year", while Polygon, Easy Allies, USGamer Giant Bomb, GameRevolution, and GameSpot listed Control among their top 10 games of 2019. PC Gamer chose Control as "Best Setting" for their Best Games of 2019. Eurogamer listed Control among its games of the year.

References

External links

505 Games games
2019 video games
Action-adventure games
Cloud-based Nintendo Switch games
Fictional government investigations of the paranormal
Golden Joystick Award winners
Interactive Achievement Award winners
Metroidvania games
Nintendo Switch games
PlayStation 4 games
PlayStation 4 Pro enhanced games
PlayStation 5 games
Remedy Entertainment games
Science fiction video games
Single-player video games
The Game Awards winners
Video games about psychic powers
Video games about the paranormal
Video games developed in Finland
Video games featuring female protagonists
Video games set in 2019
Video games set in New York City
Video games with downloadable content
Video games written by Sam Lake
Weird fiction video games
Windows games
Xbox Cloud Gaming games
Xbox One games
Xbox One X enhanced games
Xbox Series X and Series S games
D.I.C.E. Award for Action Game of the Year winners
Stadia games
SCP Foundation